Razhan (also Romanized as Rāzhān) is a village in Dasht Rural District of Silvaneh District of Urmia County, West Azerbaijan province, Iran. At the 2006 National Census, its population was 2,711 in 526 households. The following census in 2011 counted 2,775 people in 637 households. The latest census in 2016 showed a population of 3,783 people in 958 households; it was the largest village in its rural district.

References 

Urmia County

Populated places in West Azerbaijan Province

Populated places in Urmia County